Raúl Medeiros (born 2 February 1975) is a Bolivian footballer. He played in one match for the Bolivia national football team in 1995. He was also part of Bolivia's squad for the 1995 Copa América tournament.

References

External links
 

1975 births
Living people
Bolivian footballers
Bolivia international footballers
Sportspeople from Santa Cruz de la Sierra
Association football forwards
BK Häcken players
Club Blooming players
Club Destroyers players
Oriente Petrolero players
Club San José players
Club Deportivo Guabirá footballers
C.D. Jorge Wilstermann players
Club Independiente Petrolero players
Bolivian expatriate footballers
Expatriate footballers in Sweden